Below the Surface is a surviving 1920 American silent drama film directed by Irvin Willat and starring Hobart Bosworth. Thomas H. Ince produced the picture with distribution through Paramount Pictures.

The film survives in the Library of Congress along with outtakes from the production and it has been released on DVD.

Plot
Based upon a description in two film magazines, Martin Flint (Bosworth) and his son Paul Flint (Lloyd Hughes) are partners in a deep sea diving business who save dive to save the lives of twenty men trapped in a sunken submarine. This brings their names to the attention of promoter James Arnold (Webb), who tries to interest them in a fraudulent scheme to extract treasure from a sunken wreck. The father declines, but the son accepts, attracted by a young woman with the promoter, Edna Gordon (Darmond), whom Luther is tricked into marrying. As a result of the dive on the treasure ship Luther becomes delirious. Edna leaves Luther and goes with James to New York City, so the father goes to an underworld dive bar in an attempt to get her back. Later, a steamer they were on sinks after a collision with a derelict, carrying the promoter and Luther's wife to their deaths. Luther refuses to accept his father's story that the woman was worthless, and dives on the sunken steamer only to discover his dead wife embraced in the arms of her lover James.

Cast
Hobart Bosworth as Martin Flint
Grace Darmond as Edna Gordon
Lloyd Hughes as Paul Flint
George Webb as James Arnold
Gladys George as Alice
J. P. Lockney as Dave
Edith Yorke as Marth Flint
George Clair as Geb Quail

See also
List of Paramount Pictures films

References

External links

allmovie/synopsis; Below the Surface
 from the Eye Filmmuseum, Amsterdam (Dutch intertitles)

1920 films
American silent feature films
Paramount Pictures films
Films based on short fiction
1920 drama films
Silent American drama films
American black-and-white films
Films directed by Irvin Willat
1920s American films
1920s English-language films